Joseph-Alphida Crête (July 9, 1890 – April 20, 1964) was a Liberal Member of the Legislative Assembly of Quebec and the House of Commons of Canada.

Early life

He was born on July 9, 1890, in Saint-Stanislas, Quebec and worked as an optician before entering politics.

Provincial politics

Crête successfully ran as a Quebec Liberal Party candidate for the district of Laviolette in the 1931 provincial election.

Federal politics

Shortly before the 1935 federal election, Crête resigned his provincial seat and became Liberal Party of Canada candidate for the district of Saint-Maurice—Laflèche. He won.

He was re-elected in the 1940 election, but was defeated in the 1945 election by Bloc Populaire candidate René Hamel.

References

1890 births
1964 deaths
Members of the House of Commons of Canada from Quebec
Liberal Party of Canada MPs
Quebec Liberal Party MNAs